This article lists political parties in Colombia.

Colombia had historically maintained a two-party system, which means that there were two dominant political parties, resulting in considerable difficulty for anybody to achieve major electoral success under the banner of any other party. Dissidents from the two main parties also had chances to win elections.  Nowadays it is a multi-party system, with every party that gets more than 3% of the valid votes for each of the two chambers in the congress (as well as some special cases like parties of minority groups) getting legal recognition.

Parties with legal recognition 
In the Parliamentary election of 2022, the following parties got the minimum required number of votes for legal recognition (3% of valid votes).

Parties of ethnic minorities 
The following parties obtained representation in the congress despite not surpassing the required percentage, thanks to being in representation of ethnic minorities.

Defunct parties
 Christian National Party (2002)
 Christians for Community (2002)
 Alternative Way (2002)
 Alternative for Social Advance (2002)
 Citizens' Movement (2002)
 Citizens' Political Movement for Bocaya (2002)
 Civic People's Convergence (2002)
 Civic Purpose Colombia (2002)
 Coalition (2002)
 Colombia Always (2002)
 Colombian People's Party (2002)
 Colombian Social Democratic Party (2002)
 Democratic Progressivity (2002)
 Democratic Unity Party (2002)
 Front of Hope (2002)
 Community Participation (2002-2000s)
 Citizens' Convergence (2002-2000s)
 Colombia Unite (2002-2000s)
 Colombian Community and Communal Political Movement (2002-2000s)
 Democratic Colombia Party (2003-2000s)
 For the Country of Our Dreams (2006)
 New Huila and Liberalism (2006)
 Citizen Option (2009)

Notes

References

See also

 Lists of political parties
Liberalism in Colombia

Colombia
 
Political parties
Political parties
Colombia